Mucuchí–Marripú was a language used in Venezuela.

References

Indigenous languages of the Americas
Timotean languages
Extinct languages
Languages of Venezuela